The following is a list of notable deaths in December 2000.

Entries for each day are listed alphabetically by surname. A typical entry lists information in the following sequence:
 Name, age, country of citizenship at birth, subsequent country of citizenship (if applicable), reason for notability, cause of death (if known), and reference.

December 2000

1
Moses Abramovitz, 88, American economist.
Robert V. Barron, 67, American TV and film director.
George Finola, 55, American jazz cornetist.
Barbara Gates, 66, American baseball player (AAGPBL).
Jack Hemingway, 77, Canadian-American fly fisherman, writer and son of novelist Ernest Hemingway.
Elmer E. Rasmuson, 91, American banker, philanthropist and politician.
Terry Wilshusen, 51, American baseball player.
Howard Yerges, 75, American gridiron football player.

2
Chris Antley, 34, American jockey (Racing Hall of Fame) (winner of Kentucky Derby 1991, 1999), drug overdose.
Gail Fisher, 65, American actress (Mannix), renal failure.
Rosemarie Frankland, 57, Welsh actress, model and beauty queen, drug overdose.
Arthur Oglesby, 76, British writer, photographer, filmmaker, broadcaster and fisherman, infection after heart surgery.
Pete "El Conde" Rodríguez, 67, American salsa singer, heart attack.
Michael Schumann, 54, (East) German philosophy professor and politician, traffic accident.
Daniel Singer, 74, Polish-American socialist writer and journalist, lung cancer.
Emily Wilkens, 83, American fashion designer.
Bian Zhilin, 89, Chinese poet and literature researcher.

3
Gwendolyn Brooks, 83, American poet.
Hoyt Curtin, 78, composer.
Jun Fukuda, 77, Japanese film director.
Bobby Kottarakkara, 48, Indian actor, heart attack.
Red Nonnenkamp, 89, American baseball player.
Hugh Edward Richardson, 94, British diplomat and Tibetologist.
Frank Roper, 85, British sculptor and stained-glass artist.

4
Tito Arévalo, 89, Filipino actor and musician.
Henck Arron, 64, Suriname politician and Prime Minister, cardiac arrest.
H. C. Artmann, 79, Austrian poet and writer.
Shyam Sundar Baishnab, Bangladeshi folk singer.
Colin Cowdrey, Baron Cowdrey of Tonbridge, 67, English cricketer.
Gisela Kahn Gresser, 94,  American chess player.
Luke Lindoe, 87, Canadian painter, sculptor, and ceramic artist.
Puntillita, 79, Cuban singer.

5
Ahmad Zaidi Adruce, 74, Malaysian governor.
Ghulam Dastagir Alam, Pakistani theoretical physicist.
Rupert Charles Barneby, 89, American botanist.
Clarence Gracey, 89, American football player.
Matthew Lukwiya, 43, Ugandan physician, ebola virus disease.
O. W. Wolters, 85, British academic, historian and author.

6
Donald Angelini, 74, American mobster with the Chicago Outfit.
Thomas Babe, 59, American playwright, lung cancer.
Thomas F. Darcy, 67, American political cartoonist.
Rijk Gispen, 90, Dutch virologist.
Daniel Hittle, 50, American serial killer and mass murderer, execution by lethal injection.
Enrique Anderson Imbert, 90, Argentine novelist and short-story writer.
Werner Klemperer, 80, German actor, singer and musician.
Chrystabel Leighton-Porter, 87, British model.
Aziz Mian, 58, Pakistani qawwali, complications of hepatitis.
Izzat Traboulsi, 87, Syrian politician, economist, banker, and writer.

7
Edward Castro, 50, American convicted murderer, execution by lethal injection.
Vlado Gotovac, 70, Croatian poet and politician.
Levi Jackson, 74, American football player, first African-American to captain Yale University.
John Jay, 84, American filmmaker and ski film pioneer.
Toby Low, 1st Baron Aldington, 86, British politician.
Leszek Podhorodecki, Polish historian.
Bob Voigts, 84, American sports player and coach.

8
Gary Bergman, 62, Canadian ice hockey player.
Ann T. Bowling, 57, American geneticist, stroke.
Julian Dixon, 66, American politician, heart attack.
Neil Staebler, 95, American politician, Alzheimer's disease.
Ionatana Ionatana, 62, Prime Minister of Tuvalu (1999 – 2000).
Lionel Rogosin, 76, American filmmaker.
Tad Tadlock, 69, American dancer and choreographer.
Al Timothy, 85, Trinidad and Tobago jazz and calypso musician and songwriter, complications of a stroke.

9
Robert Armitage, 45, South African cricketer, cancer.
John Hock, 72, American football player, lung cancer.
Sachindra Lal Singh, 93, Indian politician, Chief Minister of Tripura.
Tyrone McGriff, 42, American football player, heart attack.
Billie Yorke, 89, British tennis player.

10
José Águas, 70, Portuguese footballer.
Paul Avery, 66, American journalist, pulmonary emphysema.
Jack Cowan, 73, Canadian football player.
Dick Healey, 77, Australian politician and sports broadcaster.
Sergey Maduev, 44, Soviet/Russian serial killer, heart failure.
James T. McHugh, 68, American Roman Catholic prelate.
Willard Nixon, 72, American baseball player.
Teresa Sterne, 73, American concert pianist and record producer, Lou Gehrig’s disease.
Marie Windsor, 80, American actress

11
Pauline Curley, 96, American vaudeville and silent film actress, pneumonia.
David Lewis, 84, American actor.
Shaista Suhrawardy Ikramullah, 85, Pakistani politician, diplomat and author.
Jack Liebowitz, 100, American book publisher (DC Comics).
N. Richard Nash, 87, American dramatist.
Velvert Turner, 49, American guitarist, and vocalist (The Velvert Turner Group).
Johannes Virolainen, 86, Finnish politician.

12
Michael D'Asaro Sr., 62, American fencing master and coach.
Red Barkley, 88, American baseball player.
William J. Evans, 76, United States Air Force general.
Alastair Graham, 94, Scottish zoologist  and academic.
James Andrew Harris, 68, American nuclear chemist.
Rosa King, 61, American jazz and blues musician.
Dorothy Kirby, 80, American golfer.
Libertad Lamarque, 92, Argentine-Mexican actress and singer.
George Montgomery, 84, American actor.
J. H. Patel, 70, Indian politician and Chief Minister of Karnataka.
Jimmy Scarth, 74, English football player.
Ndabaningi Sithole, 80, Zimbabwean politician and rival of Robert Mugabe.

13
Geoffrey Beyts, 92, British Indian Army officer and colonial official in Kenya.
Pierre Demargne, 97, French historian and archaeologist.
Aharon Harel, 68, Israeli politician.
Sandy Johnstone, 84, Scottish Royal Air Force air marshall.
Jake Jones, 80, American baseball player.
Gene Schoor, 86, American sportswriter, journalist and restaurateur.
Chen Zhen, 45, Chinese-French conceptual artist, cancer.

14
Allan Turner Howe, 73, American politician.
Roger Judrin, 91, French writer and literary critic.
Myroslav Ivan Lubachivsky, 82, Ukrainian Catholic bishop.
John Mahnken, 78, American basketball player.
Pavel Plotnikov, 80, Soviet air force general.
Uldis Pūcītis, 63, Latvian actor, scriptwriter and film director, pulmonary embolism.
Princess Marie Alexandra of Schleswig-Holstein, 73, German noble.

15
Trevor Adams, 54, British actor, cancer.
George Alcock, 88, English astronomer.
Haris Brkić, 26, Yugoslav basketball player, shot.
Bubba Floyd, 83, American baseball player.
Inigo Gallo, 68, Swiss comedian, radio personality, and actor.
Jacques Goddet, 95, French sports journalist and director of the Tour de France.
Jose Gonzales-Gonzales, 78, American actor and brother of Pedro Gonzalez Gonzalez, myeloblastic anemia.
Les Logan, 92, Australian politician.
Stanisław Miedza-Tomaszewski, 87, Polish war artist, and underground fighter.
Chiang Peng-chien, 60, Taiwanese politician, pancreatic cancer.

16
Saad Dahlab, Algerian politician.
Blue Demon, 78, Mexican masked wrestler and actor, myocardial infarction.
Margo Moore, 69, American actress and fashion model.
Victor Owusu, 76, Ghanaian politician and lawyer.
Hugh W. Pinnock, 66, general authority LDS Church, pulmonary fibrosis.
Chuck Pratt, 61, American rock climber, heart attack.
Theo Saevecke, 89, Nazi German SS officer.

17
Gerald Aylmer, 74, British historian.
Gérard Blain, 70, French actor and film director.
Czesław Główczyński, 87, Polish fighter ace of the Polish Air Force during World War II.
Blaise Rabetafika, 68, Malagasy diplomat.
Erich Schmid, 93, Swiss conductor.

18
Paddy Barry, 72, Irish hurler.
Hal Call, 83, American LGBT rights activist, and U.S. Army veteran, congestive heart failure.
Harry DeWolf, 97, Canadian naval officer during World War II.
Stan Fox, 48, American race car driver.
Randolph Apperson Hearst, 85, American newspaper publisher (Hearst Corporation).
Norman Humphries, 83, English cricketer.
Kirsty MacColl, 41, British singer-songwriter.
Madhavapeddi Satyam, 78, Indian actor and singer.
Nick Stewart, 90, American television and film actor.

19
Rob Buck, 42, American musician (10,000 Maniacs).
David Dewayne Johnson, 37, American murderer, execution by lethal injection.
Jay Gluck, 73, American archaeologist and historian, Parkinson's disease.
György Györffy, 83, Hungarian historian.
Milt Hinton, 90, American double bassist and photographer.
Ľudovít Kroner, 75, Slovak actor.
John Lindsay, 79, 103rd Mayor of New York City.
Lou Polli, 99, Italian-American baseball player.
Son Sann, 89, Cambodian politician and resistance leader.
Roebuck "Pops" Staples, 85, patriarch of The Staple Singers.
Lou Thuman, 84, American baseball player.
Cornelis Verwoerd, 87, Dutch Delftware painter, modeler, and ceramist.
Sir Laurence Whistler, 88, British poet and artist.

20
Reginald E. Beauchamp, 90, American sculptor.
Bill Clarke, 68, Canadian footballer.
Wayne Connally, 77, American politician.
Mirza Ghulam Hafiz, 80, Bangladeshi statesman, politician, and philanthropist.
Richard Hazard, 79, American television composer, conductor and songwriter, cancer.
Adrian Henri, 68, British poet and painter (Liverpool Poets).
Alexander Ramsay of Mar, 80, British aristocrat.

21
Rober Eryol, 70, Turkish football player.
Alfred J. Gross, 82, American inventor and a pioneer in mobile wireless communication.
Florynce Kennedy, 84, American lawyer, feminist, civil rights advocate, and activist.
John Lee, 72, Australian actor.
Edward Miller, 85, British historian (Master of Fitzwilliam College, Cambridge).
Aaron Novick, 81, American molecular biologist, pneumonia.
Gord Reay, 57, Canadian Army officer, road accident.

22
Arthur Juda Cohen, 90, Dutch resistance leader during World War II.
Herman Feshbach, 83, American physicist.
Stuart Lancaster, 80, American actor.
Connie McCready, 79, American journalist and politician, complications from a stroke.
Harry Payne, 93, Welsh rugby player.
Kakou Senda, 76, Japanese writer.
Allan Smethurst, 73, English folk singer, heart attack.

23
Wilfred Arthur, 81, Australian fighter ace of the RAAF during World War II.
Billy Barty, 76, American actor.
Susan Berman, 55, American journalist, author, and the daughter of Davie "Davie the Jew" Berman.
Victor Borge, 91, Danish-born comedian and pianist.
Noor Jehan, 74, Pakistani actress and singer.
Jimmy McNatt, 82, All-American basketball player for the Oklahoma Sooners and the AAU's Phillips 66ers.
Sir Jimmy Shand, 92, Scottish musician.
Marvin Williams, 80, American baseball second baseman.

24
John Cooper, 77, British automobile designer (Cooper Car Company).
Johnny Flamingo, 66, American rhythm and blues singer and lyricist.
Sadek Hilal, 70, Egyptian-American radiologist.
Seo Jeong-ju, 85, Korean poet and university professor.
Nick Massi, 73, bass singer and bass guitarist for The Four Seasons.
Dan Turk, 38, American gridiron football player (Pittsburgh Steelers, Tampa Bay Buccaneers, Oakland Raiders, Washington Redskins), testicular cancer.
Laurence Chisholm Young, 95, American mathematician.

25
Truus Baumeister, 93, Dutch freestyle swimmer.
Décio Esteves, 73, Brazilian football player and coach.
George Feigenbaum, 71, American basketball player.
Robert Francis Garner, 80, American Roman Catholic prelate.
Joe Gilliam, 49, American gridiron football player (Pittsburgh Steelers), cocaine overdose.
Neil Hawke, 61, Australian cricketer.
Flora Sadler, Scottish mathematician and astronomer.
Sam Savitt, 83, American equine artist, author, and book illustrator.
Peter W. Staub, 90, Swish actor and singer.
Willard Van Orman Quine, 92, American philosopher and logician in the analytic tradition.
Ignacy Tłoczyński, 89, Polish tennis player and coach.

26
John Coatta, 71, American football player and coach.
Leo Gordon, 78, American character actor, cardiac failure.
Sir Alan Harris, 84, British engineer.
Walter Hayes, British journalist and business executive.
Magik, 22, Polish rapper, suicide by jumping.
John McLeay Jr., 78, Australian politician.
Herman Nickerson Jr., 87, United States Marine Corps lieutenant general.
Jason Robards, 78, American actor (winner of a Tony Award, two Academy Awards and an Emmy Award), lung cancer.

27
William Hanes Ayres, 84, American politician, heart and kidney ailments.
Harold Bird-Wilson, 81, British Royal Air Force officer.
Marc Boileau, 68, Canadian ice hockey coach and player.
Frances Jones Bonner, American psychoanalyst.
Forbes Howie, 80, Scottish businessman.
Walter Keane, 85, American plagiarist.
Jack McVea, 86, American swing, blues, and R&B woodwind player and bandleader.
Roy Partee, 83, American Major League Baseball catcher.

28
Douglas Rivers Bagnall, 82, New Zealand Royal Air Force officer.
Vivian Blake, 79, Jamaican lawyer and politician.
Aminuddin Dagar, 77, Indian Dhrupad singer.
Arnold Hutschnecker, 102, Austrian-American medical doctor.
Jacques Laurent, 81, French writer and journalist.
Jimmie Selph, 85, American country music, rockabilly and bluegrass musician.
Robert Williams, 83, American baseball player.
Charlotte Wilson, 27, British volunteer teacher, murdered by a Hutu rebel group.

29
Adele Stimmel Chase, 83, American artist.
Herbert Halpert, 89, American anthropologist and folklorist.
Woodley Lewis, 75, American football player, heart and kidney problems.

30
James C. Corman, 80, American politician (U.S. Representative for California's 21st and 22nd congressional districts).
Julius J. Epstein, 91, American screenwriter (co-winner of Academy Award for Casablanca).
John Hardon, 86, American Jesuit priest, writer, and theologian.
Lionel Hebert, 72, American professional golfer.
Willie D. Warren, 76, American electric blues guitarist, bass player and singer.

31
Jean Canfield, 81, Canadian politician.
Alan Cranston, 86, American politician, served as U.S. Senator from California (1969-1993).
Harry Dorish, 79, American baseball player (Boston Red Sox, St. Louis Browns, Chicago White Sox, Baltimore Orioles).
José Greco, 82, Italian-American flamenco dancer and choreographer.
Isaac Guillory, 53, American folk guitarist, complications from cancer.
Tanaquil Le Clercq, 71, French ballet dancer (New York City Ballet).
Anne Macnaghten, 92, British violinist.
Kenneth Lee Pike, 88, American linguist and anthropologist.
Edna Savage, 64, British pop singer.
V. V. K. Valath, 82, Indian writer, poet, and historian of Malayalam language.
Binyamin Ze'ev Kahane, 34, Israeli rabbi and settler, shot.

References 

2000-12
 12